Ambasamudram is a constituency in Tamil Nadu legislative assembly, that includes the city, Ambasamudram. It is a part of the Tenkasi Lok Sabha constituency. In 2011 election, the constituency had 193,552 total electorate comprising 96,157 males and 97,395 females. It has many Maravar, Scheduled Caste and Nadar voters. Other castes forming a sizeable number of voters are Brahmins, Illathu Pillaimars, Chettiars, Muslims and Sengunthar Mudaliars. It is one of the 234 State Legislative Assembly Constituencies in Tamil Nadu, in India.

Madras State

Tamil Nadu

Election results

2021

2016

2011

2006

2001

1996

1991

1989

1984

1980

1977

1971

1967

1962

1957

1952

References 

 

Assembly constituencies of Tamil Nadu
Tirunelveli district